This article details the fixtures and results of the UAE national football team in 1979. 

After a two year wait, the national team finally played more international football matches and the first games to be played in their homeland for the 1980 AFC Asian Cup qualification games. The first time the UAE had entered the AFC Asian Cup.

The UAE also entered the 5th Arabian Gulf Cup held in Iraq.

Schedule

1980 AFC Asian Cup qualification

1980 AFC Asian Cup qualification

1980 AFC Asian Cup qualification

5th Arabian Gulf Cup

5th Arabian Gulf Cup

5th Arabian Gulf Cup

5th Arabian Gulf Cup

5th Arabian Gulf Cup

5th Arabian Gulf Cup

National team
National team
1979
United